Saeid Bayat (26 March 1986) is an Iranian football midfielder who plays for Shahin Bushehr in the Azadegan League.

Club career
He played with Esteghlal in 2007–08 season.

He played for Sepahan between 2002 and 2008, which became IPL Champions in the 2002/03 season. He was also member of Sepahan at 2007 FIFA Club World Cup.

Club career statistics

 Assist Goals

Honours

Club
Hazfi Cup
Runner up:1
2011–12 with Shahin Bushehr

References

External links
 Saeid Bayat at Persian League

Iranian footballers
1986 births
Living people
Esteghlal F.C. players
Pas players
Gostaresh Foulad F.C. players
Shahin Bushehr F.C. players
People from Zanjan, Iran
Association football midfielders